Albert Leroy Rule (born 27 July 1886 Hastings, Michigan; died 10 August 1943 Chicago) was a producer and director of two World War I documentaries.<ref>Ineffective Methods''', The Times-Picayune,  col. 2, pg. 8, January 28, 1939</ref>  Rule had served as a private in the American Expeditionary Forces of World War I and received a discharge in 1920.  Rule adopted a nickname title of "Colonel" while in the movie business.

 Filmography 
 The Big Drive, (premier: December 14, 1932, McVickers Theater, Chicago), directed by Albert L. Rule, distributed by RKO
 When Germany Surrendered, originally released as The Death Parade (premier: 1934, Danville, Illinois, re-released 1939), produced, directed, and narrated by Albert L. Rule, distributed by RKOMotion Picture Herald, pg. 37, February 3, 1934 

 External links 
 Review of "The Big Drive, Turner Classic Movies
 Review of The Death Parade, American Film Institute, Catalog of Feature Films

 References General references Thomas Patrick Doherty, Pre-Code Hollywood: Sex, Immorality, and Insurrection in American Cinema, 1930-1934 pg. 205 (News on Screen), Columbia University Press (1999)     Inline citations''

1886 births
1943 deaths
American alternative journalists
American documentary filmmakers
American social commentators
Writers from Michigan
People from Hastings, Michigan
United States Army personnel of World War I
Film directors from Michigan